Group G of the 2015 Africa Cup of Nations qualification tournament was one of the seven groups to decide the teams which qualified for the 2015 Africa Cup of Nations finals tournament. Group G consisted of four teams: Tunisia, Senegal, Egypt, and Botswana, who played against each other home-and-away in a round-robin format.

Standings

Matches

Goalscorers

Discipline

Notes

References

External links 
Orange Africa Cup Of Nations Qualifiers, CAFonline.com

Group G